Anacithara brevicostata is a species of sea snail, a marine gastropod mollusk in the family Horaiclavidae.

Description
The length of the shell attains 4.5 mm, its diameter 2 mm.

(Original description) The small, thin shell has an elongate-ovate shape. Its colour is pale buff, with a narrow subsutural baud. It contains six rounded whorls, including the two whorls in the protoconch, which is smooth, turbinate, and slightly tilted. The ribs are rather prominent, rounded and broader than their interstices. They number nine on the penultimate whorl and on the body whorl ten.;These are spaced more widely than those above, commencing at the suture and terminating rather abruptly at the periphery. The spirals are even, comparatively coarse, and close-set threads, which overrun the whole shell. The wide aperture is unarmed. The varix is slight. The sinus is indistinct. The siphonal canal is a mere notch.

Distribution
This marine species is endemic to Australia and occurs off Queensland.

References

External links
  Tucker, J.K. 2004 Catalog of recent and fossil turrids (Mollusca: Gastropoda). Zootaxa 682:1–1295.

brevicostata
Gastropods of Australia
Gastropods described in 1922